Hailed by critics as "the first and probably last Israeli hippie film", Shalom (Wayfarer's Prayer) is director Yaky Yosha's first feature. It attempts to answer the dilemmas and distresses youth in the pre Yom Kippur War Israel.

Plot 
Shalom, a young Israeli at the outset of his life, was born into a bourgeois family in Tel-Aviv. His parents wish he would go to college, but Shalom doesn't feel like studying. His father isn't quite convinced his beloved son is doing the best he can when not doing anything at all.
Shalom has a dilapidated station-wagon, two girlfriends to ride and love and "don't think twice, it's all right", as one of them sings to her sweet babbling infant. Shalom goes out on the road looking for his own self – an Israeli easy rider. In his wandering he comes across a group of artists debating over Israel's social-political fate. War and peace, occupied territories and settlements, rich and poor. One thing is not up for discussion, the future doesn't seem bright.
Shalom makes up his mind to leave it all and go to America. Makes up his mind, but stays.

References 
 The content of this article was translated from שלום, תפילת הדרך שלום, תפילת הדרך (Shalom) in the Hebrew-language Wikipedia, acknowledged here under terms of the GNU Free Documentation License.

External links 
 

1973 films
1973 drama films
Hippie films
1970s Hebrew-language films
Films directed by Yaky Yosha
Israeli drama films